In sailing, gaskets are lengths of rope or fabric used for reefing a sail, or hold a stowed sail in place. In modern use, the term is usually restricted to square-rigged ships, the equivalent items on yachts being referred to by the more prosaic "sail ties".

On most ships, gaskets are made of rope. They are attached to the top of the yard and, left loose, would hang behind the sail. Gaskets should never be left dangling, however, so when the sail is set they are brought around underneath the yard and up the back of it and then tied to the jackstay (metal rod) where they originated. Alternatively, longer gaskets - particularly the clew gaskets described below - can be secured using a gasket coil. When the sail is to be stowed it is first folded and bagged neatly within itself, pulled onto the top of the yard, and then the gaskets are brought round over it and secured to the jackstay to hold it in place. Gaskets should be tied with a slippery hitch to enable them to be let off quickly, though if the yard is large there may only be enough rope to form a clove hitch when the gasket is brought round it.

Most ships are equipped with clew gaskets at the outer ends of the yards. These do not pass around the sail, but through a shackle or ring on the blocks of the sheet. Pulled tight and secured to the jackstay or the yard's lift, this takes the load off the clewline and sail, and should allow the blocks to be lifted higher, dragging the sail down less and enabling a neater stow.

Other related articles 

Sailing rigs and rigging